The West Bengal University of Animal and Fishery Sciences (WBUAFS) is a public state veterinary university in West Bengal, India. It was established on 2 January 1995 by an Act of the West Bengal legislature. It imparts education and training in veterinary and animal sciences, dairy sciences, and fishery sciences.

History
Before the establishment of the West Bengal University of Animal and Fishery Sciences, veterinary education in West Bengal was imparted by Bengal Veterinary College. Bengal Veterinary College, established in 1893, was a premier veterinary institution in the country. It was the second oldest veterinary college in the country and the college was expanded, enriched, and functioned under the University of Calcutta until 1974. In 1974, the college was merged with Bidhan Chandra Krishi Vishwavidyalaya in Mohanpur, district Nadia, as a Faculty of Veterinary and Animal Sciences.

In 1993, a Working Group was constituted by the Animal Resources Development Department of the Government of West Bengal to discuss the modalities for the establishment of a separate animal science university. As per the recommendations of the Working Group, West Bengal state government established the West Bengal University of Animal and Fishery Sciences (WBUAFS) vide the West Bengal University of Animal & Fishery Sciences Act, 1995 by separating veterinary and animal science departments from the Bidhan Chandra Krishi Vishwavidyalaya (BCKV). Subsequently, the West Bengal University of Animal and Fishery Sciences came into being on 2 January 1995 with a legacy of century-old Bengal Veterinary College.

The present university has three distinct faculties situated at different positions of the West Bengal: Faculty of Veterinary and Animal Sciences (situated at Belgachia, Kolkata & Mohanpur, Nadia), Faculty of Fishery Sciences (situated at Chakgaria, Kolkata), and Faculty of Dairy Technology (situated at Mohanpur, Nadia). The headquarter of the university is situated in Belgachia, Kolkata.

Organisation and Administration

Governance
The governor of West Bengal is the chancellor of the West Bengal University of Animal and Fishery Sciences. The Vice-chancellor of the West Bengal University of Animal and Fishery Sciences is the chief executive officer of the university. Chanchal Guha is the current Vice-chancellor of the university.

Faculties and Departments
Different departments of the West Bengal University of Animal and Fishery Sciences (WBUAFS) has organized into three faculties:
Faculty of Veterinary and Animal Sciences
Departments of this faculty are situated at two different locations: Belgachia (in Kolkata) and Mohanpur (in Nadia district). This faculty consists of the departments of Veterinary Anatomy & Histology, Veterinary Pathology, Veterinary Parasitology, Veterinary Pharmacology & Toxicology, Veterinary Physiology, Veterinary Biochemistry, Veterinary Microbiology, Veterinary Public Health, Veterinary Epidemiology & Preventive Medicine, Veterinary Gynaecology & Obstetrics, Veterinary Surgery & Radiology, Veterinary & Animal Husbandry Extension Education, Veterinary Medicine, Ethics & Jurisprudence, Animal Genetics & Breeding, Animal Nutrition, Livestock Production Management, Livestock Products Technology, Teaching Veterinary Clinical Complex, Livestock Farm Complex, Avian Science, and Animal Biotechnology. Total 21 departments are there in this faculty.

Faculty of Dairy Technology 
Departments of this faculty are situated at Mohanpur (in Nadia district). This faculty consists of the departments of Dairy Chemistry, Dairy Microbiology, Dairy Engineering, Dairy Technology, and Dairy Business Management. Total 5 departments are there in this faculty.

Faculty of Fishery Sciences
Departments of this faculty are situated at Chakgaria (in Kolkata). This faculty consists of the departments of Aquatic Animal Health, Fishery Resource Management, Fishery Extension, Aquatic Environment Management, Fishery Economics & Statistics, Fishery Engineering, Aquaculture, Fish Processing Technology, and Fish Nutrition. Total 9 departments are there in this faculty.

Directorate of Research, Extension and Farms
The university is actively engaged in research and extension activities through the Directorate of Research, Extension and Farms functioning with three Krishi Vigyan Kendra's (Jalpaiguri, Murshidabad, and Uttar 24 Parganas). The university is equipped with modern laboratory facilities, animal hospital, and Farms.

Academics

Courses
The West Bengal University of Animal and Fishery Sciences (WBUAFS) offers different diploma, undergraduate and postgraduate courses:

 Two-year Diploma Course: Diploma in Veterinary Pharmacy (D.V.P)
 Five and half years Undergraduate (Bachelor) Degree Courses: Bachelor of Veterinary Science and Animal Husbandry (B.V.Sc & A.H.)
 Four-year Undergraduate (B.Tech) Degree Courses: B.Tech in Dairy Technology
 Undergraduate (Bachelor) Degree Courses: Bachelor of Fishery Sciences (B.F.Sc).
 Two-year Postgraduate Degree Courses: Master of Veterinary Sciences (M.V.Sc), M.Tech in Dairy Technology, Master of Fishery Sciences (M.F.Sc)

This university also offers research-level programs (Ph.D.) in Veterinary Sciences, Dairy Technology, and Fishery Sciences. For all programs in the Veterinary Sciences, the university follows the course curriculum, rules & regulations as prescribed by the Veterinary Council of India (VCI). For all programs in Dairy Technology and Fishery Sciences, the university follows the course curriculum, rules & regulations as prescribed by the Indian Council of Agricultural Research (ICAR).

Admission
For admission in the B.V.Sc & A.H., and B.F.Sc program, the candidate must have to pass higher secondary (10 +2) examination in science stream from any government recognized board. The selection of the students will be done as per the merit list based on the results of the higher secondary examination. For admission in the B.Tech (Dairy Technology) course, the candidate must have to qualify in West Bengal Joint Entrance Examination for Engineering/ Technology (WBJEE).

For admission in Postgraduate programs like M.V.Sc., M.Tech. and M.F.Sc. courses, the candidates have to secure a minimum of 6.2 Overall Grade Point Average (O.G.P.A.) in their B.V.Sc. & A.H., B.Tech. (D.T.) & B.F.Sc. courses. Besides, they have to take a written examination and personal interviews conducted by the university for final selection. For admission in the Ph.D. program, one has to also take a written examination and personal interviews conducted by the university.

Ranking and Accreditation
The university is recognized by the University Grant Commission and also accredited by the Indian Council of Agricultural Research. This university holds rank 29 in the ICAR ranking of agricultural universities.

See also 
 Karnataka Veterinary, Animal and Fisheries Sciences University
 Kerala Veterinary College, Mannuthy
 Rajiv Gandhi College of Veterinary and Animal Sciences
 List of universities in India
 List of academic institutions formerly affiliated to the University of Calcutta

References

External links 
 Official Website

Universities in Kolkata
Veterinary schools in India
Educational institutions established in 1995
Fisheries and aquaculture research institutes in India
Fishing in India
1995 establishments in West Bengal